means "steel" in Japanese. 

Hagane may also refer to:

 Hagane: The Final Conflict, a video game
 Hagane, a manga by Masaomi Kanzaki
 A Space Noah Class starship from the game Super Robot Taisen: Original Generation and its sequel
 The nickname of the 4th Tank Division of the Imperial Japanese Army during the second world war
 A central character in the Japanese manga anthology Glass Wings
 A steel used for making blades (which may also be called tamahagane), such as those in Japanese swords, chisels or planes